Season of Anomy is the second novel of Nobel winning Nigerian playwright and critic Wole Soyinka. Published in 1973, the novel is one of only three novels published during Soyinka's highly productive literary career. Though highly studied as part of Soyinka's importance to the African literary canon, criticism of the novel has been mixed, with some critics describing the novel as a "failure".

Plot 
This novel influences from Soyinka's experience of being in prison. The novel talks about the role an individual can play and how he can become an agent of social transformation.
There are four main characters who take lot of actions to deal with corrupt Nigerian society.

Themes 
The novel explores "the role of individual will as the agent of social transformation", looking at the actions taken by each of the four main characters in changing the corrupt Nigerian society. Marxist critic Aisha Karim describes this as a theme similar to his other novel The Interpreters. Other critics explore other Post-Colonial social and ethnographic dynamics explored by the novel. For example, critic Joseph E Obi describes the novel as a "definitive reading of the militarized state in Africa."

Critic Obi Maduakor calls the novel an "intensely religious book", preoccupied with "moral issues". For Maduakor, the novel revolves around a quest of the social reforming main character Ofeyi in finding moral and ethical solutions to inequalities, and often these ideal solutions are found in natural or agricultural settings.

References

Further reading 

 
 

1973 Nigerian novels
Novels by Wole Soyinka